The 2012–13 Pachuca season was the 66th professional season of Mexico's top-flight football league. The season is split into two tournaments—the Torneo Apertura and the Torneo Clausura—each with identical formats and each contested by the same eighteen teams. Pachuca began their season on July 22, 2012 against Atlante, Pachuca play their homes games on Saturdays at 7:00pm local time. Pachuca did not qualify to the final phase in either the Apertura or Clausura tournament.

Torneo Apertura

Squad

 (Captain)

 

 

(Vice-Captain)

Regular season

Apertura 2012 results

Pachuca did not qualify to the Final Phase

Goalscorers

Results

Results summary

Results by round

Apertura 2012 Copa MX

Group stage

Apertura results

Knockout stage

Goalscorers

Results

Results by round

Torneo Clausura

Squad

Regular season

Clausura 2013 results

Pachuca did not qualify to the Final Phase

Goalscorers

Results

Results summary

Results by round

Clausura 2013 Copa MX

Group stage

Clausura results

Knockout stage

Goalscorers

Results

Results by round

References

Mexican football clubs 2012–13 season